Farma 2 — Ešte drsnejšia (English: The Farm 2) is the Slovak version of The Farm reality television show based on the Swedish television series of the same name. The show filmed in February–June 2012 and premiered on March 4, 2012 on Markíza.

Format
Fifteen contestants are cut out from outside world. Each week one contestant is selected the Farmer of the Week. On the first week, the contestants choose the Farmer. Since week 2, the Farmer is chosen by the contestant evicted in the previous week.

Nomination Process
The Farmer of the Week nominates two people (a man and a woman) as the Butlers. The others must decide, which Butler is the first to go to the Battle. That person than choose the second person (from the same sex) for the Battle and also the type of battle (a quiz, tug-of-war, cutting wood, surprise). The Battle winner must win two duels. The Battle loser is evicted from the game. In the live final 16th Juny 2012 Radomír Spireng won 50 000 € . Tomáš Mrva finish on the second place. Radomír Spireng won title Favorit Farmer.

Contestants 
(ages stated are at time of contest)

Future appearances
Roman Olach, Ľubomír Filkor and Tomáš Mrva returned to Farma for Farma: All-Stars, respectively placing 12th and 6th, while Mrva reach the final again.

Nominations

The game

External links
http://farma.markiza.sk
 Farma Markíza 

The Farm (franchise)
2012 Slovak television seasons